Hawera Observatory is situated in King Edward Park, Hāwera, New Zealand, and is administered and maintained by the Hawera Astronomical Society, which meets at the observatory on the second Wednesday of every month. The observatory is also opened by request of the public through the Facebook page, as well as doing open nights. The Hawera Astronomical Society also hosts a youth club that meets fortnightly.

History 
The Hawera Astronomical Society was founded by amateur astronomer and telescope maker, George Mortimer Townsend on the 29th of September, 1926, with meetings being held in his observatory on his family property on Argyle Street, Hawera.

External links
Observatory website

Astronomical observatories in New Zealand
Hāwera